Rivière-du-Portage was a settlement in Northumberland County, New Brunswick at the intersection of Route 11 and the eastern terminus of Route 370.  This community was incorporated into the Regional Municipality of Grand Tracadie–Sheila.

History

Notable people

See also
List of communities in New Brunswick

References

Neighbourhoods in Grand Tracadie-Sheila
Former municipalities in New Brunswick